The Thirty-second government of Israel, also known as the Second Netanyahu Government, was the largest cabinet in the country's history, in terms of the number of ministers: initially containing 30 ministers and nine deputy ministers, it later added another deputy prime minister as of May 2012 until he resigned in July 2012.

Formation
Following the 2009 Knesset elections, the new government was formed on 31 March 2009. It consisted of a coalition of Likud, Yisrael Beiteinu, Shas, the Labor and the Jewish Home. The parties formed a center-right coalition government.

Changes since formation
On 1 April 2009, United Torah Judaism joined as well.

In January 2011, Labor Party leader Ehud Barak formed a breakaway party, Independence, which enabled him to maintain his loyal Labor's MK faction within Netanyahu's government, and prevented the departure of Labor party as a whole from Netanyahu's coalition-government. Labor previously threatened to force Barak to do so. After Barak's move, Netanyahu was able to maintain a majority of 66 MK (out 120 in the Knesset), previously having 74 MKs within his majority coalition.

On 8 May 2012, following weeks of speculation that early elections would be called, Netanyahu announced a new National Unity Coalition after striking a deal with Kadima head Shaul Mofaz bringing the coalition majority to 94 MKs.

Kadima subsequently left the ruling coalition on 17 July due to a dispute over the Tal Law.

Basic policy guidelines
A paper presented to the Knesset's approval alongside the Government said that the Government would:
 actively seek to fortify the national security and bestow personal security on its citizens while vigorously and determinedly fighting against violence and terror.
 advance the political process and act to promote peace with all our neighbors, while preserving the security, historic and national interests of Israel.
 advance a program to deal with the economic crisis and act to create economic conditions that will allow for sustainable growth, as well as create and maintain jobs in the economy.
 strive for social justice by reducing social gaps and uncompromisingly fight against poverty through education, employment and an increase in assistance to the weaker segments of the population.
 place the issue of immigration and immigrant absorption at the top of its list of priorities and will work vigorously to increase immigration from all countries of the world.
 place education at the center of its list of national priorities and will act to advance reforms in the education system.
 preserve the Jewish character of the State and the legacy of Israel, as well as honor the religions and traditions of members of other religions in the country in accordance with the values of the Declaration of Independence.
 act to advance governmental reforms to improve stability and governability.
 act to fortify the rule of law in Israel.
 act to protect the environment in Israel, improve the quality of life for the residents of the country and increase Israel’s participation in contributing to the global effort with regard to the climate and the environment.

Cabinet members
The cabinet had 30 members.

Deputy Ministers

References

 32
2009 establishments in Israel
2013 disestablishments in Israel
Cabinets established in 2009
Cabinets disestablished in 2013
2009 in Israeli politics
2010 in Israeli politics
2011 in Israeli politics
2012 in Israeli politics
2013 in Israeli politics
 32
 32
+32